The Reformed Presbyterian Church of Ireland is a Presbyterian church in Ireland. The church currently has forty-three congregations, of which thirty-five are located in Northern Ireland; the remaining eight are located in the Republic of Ireland. As of 2011, its total communicant membership is 1,952. The distribution of Reformed Presbyterians accords with the distribution of the Ulster Scots, with most congregations based in counties Antrim, Londonderry and Down. Several new congregations have, however, been formed recently in the Belfast area, along with fellowships in Galway and Dublin.

History
The church's roots date back to the 17th-century plantation of Ulster by Scots Presbyterian settlers. When the Revolution Settlement was entered into in 1690 following the victory of William III in the Williamite War, a minority of Presbyterians refused to subscribe, claiming its failure to specifically recognise the kingship of Jesus Christ was a departure from the Solemn League and Covenant of 1643. These dissenters, or Covenanters, began to hold separate meetings from the mainstream Presbyterians. The Ulster branch of the denomination was dependent on visits from Scottish ministers until 1757.

A separate Irish presbytery was organised in April 1763, and its synod was constituted at Cullybackey on 1 May 1811.

Doctrine and practice 
Being a member church of the RP Global Alliance and part of the Reformed Presbyterian Church, the RPCI conforms to the following:

Westminster Confession of Faith
Westminster Larger Catechism
Westminster Shorter Catechism
The testimony of the Reformed Presbyterian Church of Ireland which contains a very short article outlining the two points where the RPCI disagrees with Westminster Confession of Faith, followed by fourteen short essays on points of 'practical application' which are essentially facets of Christian living on which the RPCI has a theological opinion.  Some such essays relate to the relationship between church and state, how it understands its relationship to Catholicism, or what it thinks about membership of the secret societies.

In practical terms, the Reformed Presbyterian Church is known by several distinct practices, particularly in only singing psalms and not having any musical accompaniment. There is also a strong emphasis on Christian doctrine including the sacredness of the Lord’s Day along with other RPCI beliefs. 

The RPCI have a theological college and bookshop in south Belfast. The denomination also runs residential accommodation in Ballymoney for elderly people as well as accommodation near Queen’s University for students and young people. 

The RPCI is involved in mission work around the world, including France, Spain, Sudan and Japan. 

The Covenanter Witness magazine is published each month.

See also
Reformed Presbyterian churches
Free Presbyterian Church of Ulster
Non-subscribing Presbyterian Church of Ireland
Presbyterian Church in Ireland
Evangelical Presbyterian Church

References

External links
Denominational website

Presbyterianism in Northern Ireland
Presbyterianism in the Republic of Ireland
Reformed Presbyterian Church (denominational group)
Religious organizations established in 1763
Protestant denominations established in the 18th century
All-Ireland organisations